Stephen Caesar Le Maistre was a puisne judge of the Supreme Court of Judicature at Fort William. Along with Justice Hyde and to some extent Impey, he argued for greatly expanding the powers of the Supreme Court. He died on 4 November 1777.

References

1777 deaths
British India judges